The Headies (originally called the Hip Hop World Awards) is a music awards show established in 2006 by the Hip Hop World Magazine of Nigeria to recognize outstanding achievements in the Nigerian music industry. The annual ceremony features performances by established and promising artists. It is broadcast live on HipTV to viewers across Nigeria. The first and second editions of The Headies were held at the Muson Center in Onikan, Lagos State. Between 2010 and 2012, the awards were held at the Eko Hotel and Suites in Victoria Island, Lagos. Several media personalities in Nigeria have hosted the annual ceremony, including Darey Art Alade, D'banj, Dakore Egbuson, Banky W., Rita Dominic, M.I, Tiwa Savage and Dr SID.

History and plaque
The image of The Headies was created by Ayo Animashaun, the founder of the awards, and drawn by Matthias Aragbada. The first Headie plaque was done by Jide Adewoye. It represents the "image and the shout of a young, vibrant individual whose talent can challenge that of renowned local and international artistes combined, but who has almost lost confidence in his abilities in the face of discouraging circumstances presented by the peculiar Nigerian environment." In 2008, the plaque was redone in the United Kingdom. It was plated with 21 carat gold. The new plaque is a mixture of resin, copper, steel, marble and gold.

As of 2018, The Headies is composed of 25 categories. Open voting decides majority of the awards' categories. However, the Best Recording of the Year, Best Rap Album, Best Vocal Performance (Male), Best Vocal Performance (Female), Lyricist on the Roll, and Best Performer categories are not open to public voting.

Notable moments

2000s
2006: The 1st edition of the Hip Hop World Awards was held on 10 March 2006, at the Shell Hall of the MUSON Centre in Onikan, Lagos. It was hosted by Darey Art Alade and tagged with the caption: "The Revolution is Here". DJ Jimmy Jatt, Keke Ogungbe and Dayo 'D1' Adeneye were joint winners of the Hall of Fame award. P-Square and Jude Okoye eclipsed their colleagues that year, taking home five awards.

2007: The 2nd edition of the Hip Hop World Awards was hosted by D'banj and Tana. It was held on 17 March 2007, at the Muson Center for the second consecutive year. Paul Play was nominated for six awards and ended up going home with four.

2008: The 3rd edition of the Hip Hop World Awards was hosted by comedian Basketmouth and Nollywood actress Dakore Egbuson. It was held on 15 March 2008, at Planet One in Maryland, Lagos. The founders and promoters chose the theme "Change has to Change". The nominees' party was held at Babylon, a private beach resort. In 2008, the plaque of The Headies was plated with 21 carat gold. Nigerian-French singer Aṣa won 3 awards, including Album of the Year for her eponymous debut studio album. 2face Idibia received the most nominations with six. Naeto C, Rooftop MCs, Cobhams Asuquo, Kween, Jo'zi, and P-Square all performed at the ceremony.

2009: The 4th edition of the Hip Hop World Awards was hosted by Banky W. and Kemi Adetiba. It took place on 16 May 2009, at the International Conference Centre in Abuja. The awards were held outside of Lagos for the first time. The nominees' party for the fourth edition was hosted at Ajibogun, a village in Ogun State. 9ice won a total of three awards from six nominations. Phillip Trimnell took home the Hall of Fame award.

2010: The 5th edition of the Hip Hop World Awards took place on 16 May 2009, at the Eko Hotel and Suites in Victoria Island, Lagos. The ceremony was conducted without a host. Wande Coal was the biggest winner of the night with five plaques, including Artiste of the Year. Don Jazzy won the Producer of the Year award. Hip hop duo Skuki won the Next Rated category. Da Grin's C.E.O won for Best Rap Album in a posthumous fashion. He was also honored by General Pype during the singer's performance.

2011: The 6th edition of the Hip Hop World Awards was held on 22 October 2011, at the Eko Hotel and Suites in Victoria Island, Lagos. Hosted by Rita Dominic and eLDee, the award's name was officially changed to "The Headies". 2face Idibia won three awards, including Artiste of the Year. Darey's "The Way You Are" won for Best R&B Single and Recording of the Year. M.I and Ice Prince won two awards apiece. Don Jazzy and Dr SID both took home an award. Capital Femi walked away with the Best Vocal Performance (Male) award. Wizkid won the Next Rated plaque and received a Hyundai Sonata at a later date. Waje was the only female awardee. The Hall of Fame award went to Jùjú musician Shina Peters. A total of twenty-one cart gold plaques were handed out.

2012: The 7th edition of The Headies was hosted by M.I and Omawumi. The ceremony took place on 20 October 2012, at the Eko Hotel and Suites in Victoria Island, Lagos. The aforementioned hosts thrilled fans with their song titled "The Headies". Chidinma opened the show by performing her song "Kedike". The Okoye brothers (Peter, Paul, and Jude) won a total of three awards. The Artiste of the Year award went to Wizkid. Tiwa Savage and Wande Coal won the Best Male and Female Vocal Performance categories, respectively. Vector won the Best Rap Single and Lyricist on the Roll plaques for "Angeli". Davido won the Next Rated category and was later awarded a Hyundai Sonata. The Headies celebrated the reunion of prominent Nigerian musicians from the 80s and 90s, including Onyeka Onwenu, Oris Wiliki, Mike Okori, Baba Fryo, Shina Peters, Fatai Rolling Dollar and Daddy Showkey. Femi Kuti was honored with the Hall of Fame award.

2013: The 8th edition of The Headies was held on 26 December 2013, at the Oriental Hotel in Lagos. The show was hosted by Tiwa Savage and Dr SID. Olamide was the biggest awardee of the night, winning three awards from seven nominations. Phyno won the Best Rap Single category for his song "Man of the Year". D'Tunes, Praiz, and Blackmagic all won for the first time. Sean Tizzle won the Next Rated category and was later awarded a Hyundai Tucson. Davido took home two awards, including Best R&B/Pop Album for Omo Baba Olowo. Iyanya only received one award from five nominations. Veteran Fuji artist Wasiu Ayinde Marshall was inducted into the Headies Hall of Fame. 2 Face Idibia, Banky W., Waje, Nikki Laoye, Mode 9, Dr SID and Kcee all went home with a plaque. Harrysong's tribute song to Nelson Mandela, titled "Mandela", won the Most Downloaded Callertune award.

2014: The 9th edition of The Headies took place on 14 December 2014, at the Eko Hotel and Suites in Victoria Island, Lagos. Themed "Feel the Passion", the show was hosted by Toke Makinwa and Basketmouth. It was initially scheduled to hold on 25 October 2014. Bovi was initially announced as one of the hosts, but ended up not hosting due to him being booked for another show. On 30 September 2014, nominations were announced during a press briefing at the HipTV office in Allen, Lagos. Kcee, Olamide and Phyno led the nominations with five each. Tiwa Savage, Oritse Femi and The Mavins followed closely with four apiece. Yemi Alade was nominated for Song of the Year, Best Pop Single and Next Rated. Olamide, Patoranking and Davido each took home two awards apiece. Don Jazzy won the Producer of the Year plaque, while Sir Victor Uwaifo got the Hall of Fame recognition.

2015: The 10th edition of The Headies was held on 1 January 2016, at the Landmark Events Centre in Victoria Island, Lagos. Themed "Flip the Script", the event was hosted by Bovi and Kaffy. It was previously scheduled to hold on 30 December 2015 but the organizers of the event postponed it to 1 January 2016 without citing any reason. Olamide won a total of four awards, while Timi Dakolo won three. Wizkid was nominated seven times across the twenty-one award categories. 2face Idibia was honored with the Hall of Fame award, while Don Jazzy received the Special Recognition award. Reekado Banks won the Next Rated award. His win was criticized by music critics, who challenged the "fairness of the award process".

2016: The 11th edition of The Headies was held on 22 December 2016, at the Eko Convention Centre in Victoria Island, Lagos. Themed "Think, Create, Recreate", the event was hosted by Adesua Etomi and Falz. The nominees were announced by the award's organizers in November 2016. Tekno was nominated for the Next Rated award, but ended up being disqualified due to his refusal to honour the category and support the campaign. Jazzman Olofin and Adewale Ayuba jointly performed the song "Raise the Roof". Aramide performed her song "Funmi Lowo" with assistance from Ras Kimono. The ceremony also featured additional performances from Falz, 2Baba, Seyi Shay and Flavour. Olamide received eight nominations and won a total of four, including Best Rap Single for his single "Eyan Mayweather". Mr Eazi won the Next Rated category and was awarded a SUV at a later date. Mayorkun toppled Dice Ailes and Koker for the Rookie of the Year award. Laolu Akins was honored with the Hall of Fame award, while Flavour received the Special Recognition award.

2018: The 12th edition of The Headies was held on 5 May 2018, at the Eko Convention Centre in Victoria Island, Lagos. Nigerian comedian Bovi and singer Seyi Shay hosted the ceremony. After shortlisting thousands of entries submitted during the eligibility period, the organizers of the ceremony announced the nominees in April 2018. They also announced the addition of  three categories: Viewer's Choice, Best Performer, and Industry Brand Supporter. Simi led the nominations with 7, followed by Wizkid and Davido with 6 each. The ceremony featured performances from a number of artists, including Falz, Mr Real, Simi, and the Danfo Drivers. Pulse Nigeria praised the award's sound production and stage design. Davido, Wizkid and Simi won the most awards with 3 each. Mayorkun won the Next Rated award, beating Dice Ailes, Maleek Berry and Johnny Drille.

2019: The 13th edition of The Headies was held on 19 October 2019, at the Eko Convention Centre in Victoria Island, Lagos. Themed "Power of a Dream", the ceremony was hosted by Nigerian rapper Reminisce and actress/media personality Nancy Isime. After shortlisting thousands of entries submitted between January 2018 and June 2019, the organizers of the ceremony announced the nominees on 1 October 2019. Burna Boy set a record for the most nominations in one night with 10 nominations. Teni followed with 6 and Wizkid with 5. The ceremony featured performances from a number of artists, including Styl-Plus, Sunny Neji, Duncan Mighty, Teni and Victor AD. Teni won the most awards with 4. Rema won the Next Rated award, beating Fireboy DML, Joeboy, Lyta, Victor AD and Zlatan Ibile.

2020: The 14th edition of The Headies was held on 21 February 2021, at the La Campagne Tropicana Beach Resort in   Ibeju-Lekki. Event organizers announced that TV personality and actress Nancy Isime and comedian Bovi were the hosts. This is the fourth time Bovi has hosted the event, while Nancy has become the first female to host the event for the second time.

Locations

Award categories

Current categories

Voting
Best Rap Single (2006–present)
Song of the Year (2006–present)
Best Collaboration (2006–present) 
Album of the Year (2006–present)  
Next Rated (2006–present) 
Hip Hop World Revelation of the Year (2006–present) 
Producer of the Year (2006–present) 
African Artiste of the Year (2006–present)
Best Music Video Director (2006–present)
Artiste of the Year (2006–present)
Best R&B/Pop Album (2006; 2008–present)
Best Street Hop Artiste (2009–present)
Best R&B Single (2010–present)
Best Pop Single (2010–present)
Rookie of the Year (2012–present)
Viewer's Choice (2018–present)
 Best Afrobeat Pop Single (2022–present)
 Best Afrobeat Pop Album (2022–present)
 Best African Collaboration (2022–present) 
 Best International Collaboration (2022–present)  
 African Artist of the Year (2022–present) 
  Music Executive of the Year (2022–present)
 International Artist of the Year  (2022–present) 
 Music Executive of the Year (2022–present)

Non-voting 
Best Recording of the Year (2006–present)
Best Rap Album (2006–present) 
Best Vocal Performance (Female) (2006–present) 
Best Vocal Performance (Male) (2006–present) 
Lyricist on the Roll (2006–present)
Best Performer (2018–present)
Miscellaneous
Hall of Fame (2006–present)
Special Recognition Award (2015–present)

Past award categories

Most wins
4 and up, updated to the fourteenth edition (2021).

Awards and nominations

References

 
International music awards
Hip hop awards
Awards established in 2006
Victoria Island, Lagos
2006 in Nigerian music
Entertainment events in Nigeria